Asura aurora is a moth of the  family Erebidae. It is found in India.

References

aurora
Moths described in 1891
Moths of Asia